The United States Constitution and its amendments comprise hundreds of clauses which outline the functioning of the United States Federal Government, the political relationship between the states and the national government, and affect how the United States federal court system interprets the law. When a particular clause becomes an important or contentious issue of law, it is given a name for ease of reference.

Clauses within the Articles

Clauses within the Amendments

First Amendment 
 Establishment Clause
 Free Exercise Clause
 Free Speech Clause
 Free Press Clause
 Free Assembly Clause
 Petition Clause

Fourth Amendment 
 Search and Seizure Clause

Fifth Amendment 
 Double Jeopardy Clause
 Due Process Clause (along with the Fourteenth Amendment)
 Self-Incrimination Clause
Takings Clause
Grand Jury Clause

Sixth Amendment 
 Assistance of Counsel Clause
 Compulsory Process Clause
 Confrontation Clause
 Impartial Jury Clause
 Information Clause
 Public Trial Clause
 Speedy Trial Clause
 Vicinage Clause

Eighth Amendment 
 Excessive Bail Clause

Fourteenth Amendment 
 Citizenship Clause
 Privileges or Immunities Clause
 Due Process Clause
 Equal Protection Clause

Recurring Clauses 
 Enforcement clause

References

Notes 

United States law-related lists